Ee Thalamura Ingane is a 1985 Indian Malayalam film, directed by Rochy Alex and produced by Rajan. The film stars Menaka, Prathapachandran, Sukumaran and Kuthiravattam Pappu in the lead roles. The film has musical score by G. Devarajan.

Cast
Menaka
Prathapachandran
Sukumaran
Sibichen NJ
Kuthiravattam Pappu
Kollam Ajith

Soundtrack
The music was composed by G. Devarajan and the lyrics were written by Poovachal Khader.

References

External links
 

1985 films
1980s Malayalam-language films